Hans Wouda (born 7 April 1941 in Amsterdam, North Holland) is a former water polo player from the Netherlands, who competed in the 1968 and 1972 Summer Olympics for his native country. In both games he finished in seventh position with the Dutch Men's Water Polo Team.

Wouda is married to the former Olympic swimmer Betty Heukels. He is not related to Dutch swimmer Marcel Wouda.

References

1941 births
Living people
Dutch male water polo players
Olympic water polo players of the Netherlands
Water polo players at the 1968 Summer Olympics
Water polo players at the 1972 Summer Olympics
Water polo players from Amsterdam
20th-century Dutch people